Priscila Fantin de Freitas (born 18 February 1983) is a Brazilian actress.

Biography 
Priscila Fantin was born in Salvador, Bahia, but she was raised in Belo Horizonte, Minas Gerais.

Career 
She became famous for her role as Tatiana on the TV series Malhação. After Malhação, she went on to have a successful career, starring in many of Globo's dramas.

Coincidentally, she mostly did historical soaps. Her first one (and first starring role) Esperança who had similar story-line as the successful Terra Nostra flopped. But her next two soaps Chocolate com Pimenta and Alma Gêmea, shown at the afternoon and not at prime-time, were big hits and did amazingly well at the ratings.

Filmography

Television

Film

Theater

Personal life 
On 24 January 2011, after doing a blood test Priscila Fantin had confirmation of her pregnancy with her boyfriend, actor Renan Abreu. On 16 August 2011 Fantin gave birth to her son Romeo with her boyfriend, actor Renan Abreu.

References

External links

Official Site
 
Entrevista Priscila Fantin

1983 births
Living people
People from Salvador, Bahia
Brazilian people of Italian descent
Brazilian television actresses
Brazilian film actresses
Brazilian telenovela actresses
Brazilian stage actresses
People from Belo Horizonte